The Canon de 194 mm Modèle 1902 was a medium-caliber naval gun used as the primary or secondary armament in both casemates and turrets of a number of French pre-dreadnoughts and armored cruisers during World War I.  After World War I these ships were scrapped and some were later reused as coastal artillery in World War II

Naval service
Ship classes that carried the Canon de 194 mm Modèle 1902 include:
Edgar Quinet-class cruisers - The two ships of this class were armed with fourteen guns.  Four were in twin turrets forward and aft, three were in single gun turrets on each side.  The last four guns were mounted in casemates amidships.
Cruiser Ernest Renan -  The primary armament of this ship consisted of four guns mounted in twin turrets fore and aft.
Cruiser Jules Michelet - The primary armament of this ship consisted of four guns mounted in twin turrets fore and aft.
Liberté-class - The secondary armament of this class consisted of ten guns.  Three were mounted in single turrets on each side of the ship and four were in casemates amidships.

Gallery

Notes

References

External links 
http://www.navweaps.com/Weapons/WNFR_76-50_m1902.php

Naval guns of France
194 mm artillery
World War I naval weapons
Coastal artillery